Strangers is a 1991 Australian film directed by Craig Lahiff and starring James Healey and Anne Looby.

Premise
Stockbroker Gary has an affair with the dangerous Anna.

Production
It was shot from 16 October to 24 November 1989.

Craig Lahiff says it was inspired by Strangers on a Train and claims it was the first movie financed by the Film Finance Corporation to make its budget back in sales.

References

External links

Strangers at Oz Movies

Australian thriller films
1991 films
1990s English-language films
1990s Australian films